Elliottia is a genus of plants in the Ericaceae, with four species, two in North America and two in Japan. It is named after botanist Stephen Elliott.

Species
The genus consists of the following species:

 Elliottia bracteata, native to Japan
Elliottia paniculata, native to Japan
Elliottia pyroliflora, native to western North America
Elliottia racemosa, a rare species of southeastern North America

References

Ericaceae genera
Ericoideae
Taxa named by Gotthilf Heinrich Ernst Muhlenberg